Singapore Life Limited, commonly known as Singlife with Aviva or Singlife, is a Singaporean insurance company.

History
Singlife was established by Walter de Oude in 2017 as the first local insurer to be licensed by the MAS since 1970. In 2018, Singlife acquired the business portfolio of Zurich Life Singapore. In 2020, Singlife and Aviva Singapore announced a merger deal valued at $3.2 billion, which made the combined company the largest insurer in Singapore.

References

External links 

Financial services companies established in 2017
Singaporean companies established in 2017
Insurance companies of Singapore
Aviva
Singaporean brands